Bidezabal is a station on line 1 of the Bilbao metro. It is located in the neighborhood of Algorta, in the municipality of Getxo. The station opened as part of the metro on 11 November 1995.

History 
The station first opened to the public in 1893 as part of the Las Arenas-Plentzia railway, operated by the Las Arenas-Plencia Railway Company. At the time it was known as Guecho station. At Las Arenas, in the municipality of Getxo, the line connected with the Bilbao-Las Arenas railway. Direct services between Bilbao and Bidezabal started in 1901.

Starting in 1947, the narrow-gauge railway companies that operated within the Bilbao metropolitan area were merged to become Ferrocarriles y Transportes Suburbanos, shortened FTS and the first precedent of today's Bilbao metro. In 1977, the FTS network was transferred to the public company FEVE and in 1982 to the recently created Basque Railways. In the 1980s it was decided the station, just like most of the former railway line, would be integrated into line 1 of the metro, with the new station opening now as part of the metro network on 11 November 1995.

Station layout 

It is an overground station with two side platforms. The main hall is located directly above the tracks.

Access 

  13 Bidezabal St.
   Sarri St. (only for the Plentzia-bound platform)
    11 Aita Domingo Iturrate St. (only for the Etxebarri-bound platform)
   Station's interior

Services 
The station is served by line 1 from Etxebarri to Plentzia.

References

External links
 

Line 1 (Bilbao metro) stations
Railway stations in Spain opened in 1893
Railway stations in Spain opened in 1995
1995 establishments in the Basque Country (autonomous community)
Getxo